Henry George Keller (April 3, 1869 – August 3, 1949) was an American artist who led a generation of Ohio watercolor painters of the Cleveland School. Keller's students at the Cleveland School of Art and his Berlin Heights, Ohio summer school included Charles E. Burchfield, Paul Travis, and Frank N. Wilcox.

In the Leslie Family Record, by Elvesta Thomas Leslie (1968, self-published), a first cousin of Henry, spoke of Henry Keller:

"As Mortimer (Leslie) died young, widowhood threw Guineveer’s mother (Elizabeth Bonsor) to the support of herself and her small girl. She met the heavy and double misfortune with fortitude and competency even as you and your (Elvesta’s) aunt Rosa (Kehl) met like but more tragic adversities. She took orders for busts in crayon and hired artists to draw them. In this way she met young Keller, and Guineveer, her romance. Henry made portraits for the mother. Henry Keller was educated here (Cleveland) and in Munich. He was one of a small galaxy of local artists who have won honors in more metropolitan centers. He is a pioneer of the city’s higher cultural life. A harder, or mor conscientious worker can not be found. He maintains his better than average constitution, inherited from German-born parents, by regular life and exemplary habits. He is the only noted artist who doesn’t smoke, that I ever heard of. Cigarettes seem the sustenance of the artistic temperament. Henry teaches painting at the Art School and specializes in animal life and watercolor. I have one of his best. His canvasses are distinguished more for the excellence of their technique and craftsmanship than for creative genius. I found Keller a zealous devotee of his profession and outside of it, enough of a cynic to be realistic. In a word he is master of a fine art, man of fine character and characteristically German. His home was originally a farm house owned by his father before Cleveland grew up to be a city."

In 1939 he was elected into the National Academy of Design as an Associate Academician.

External links
Works by Henry G. Keller at Cleveland Public Library

1869 births
1949 deaths
19th-century American painters
American male painters
20th-century American painters
Cleveland School (arts community)
People from Berlin Heights, Ohio
19th-century American male artists
20th-century American male artists